Ijaz Ahmed (born 20 September 1968 in Sialkot) is a Pakistani cricket coach and former cricketer who played 60 Tests and 250 One Day Internationals for Pakistan over a period from 1986 to 2001.

Personal life
His family roots lie in the city of Jalandhar, in India's Punjab, where some of his cousins still live.

International career

Ahmed scored six Test centuries against the world's top-ranked side, Australia – a record number of centuries by a Pakistani against Australia, shared with Javed Miandad. However, 33 of his 92 innings yielded single-figure scores, 54 of them yielded scores below 20.

Ijaz Ahmed came into the national side at the height of the Imran Khan era, and remained on the fringes for nearly a decade, despite several good scores. Dropped after the 1992 World Cup, he came back strongly the following season and established himself at the pivotal "one down" position. He performed poorly at the 1999 World Cup, and the arrival of Younis Khan brought an end to his international career. He formally retired from cricket in 2003.

Ahmed's 250 matches is the seventh-highest of all time in Pakistan, behind Shahid Afridi, Inzamam-ul-Haq, Wasim Akram, Saleem Malik, Younis Khan, Waqar Younis and Shoaib Malik.

A powerful hitter of the ball, Ahmed became the second Pakistani Batsman to score 10 ODI centuries. At Lahore, in 1997, Ahmed collapsed the Indian bowling attack by making a quick century off just 68 balls including 9 sixes, remaining not out for 139*; his highest score in the ODI.

In Test cricket, Ahmed scored 12 Test centuries, including his first and only double century against Sri Lanka, when he scored 211. Ahmed is the top scorer for Pakistan side against South Africa.

The event of 21 April 1997

On 21 April 1997, in a Test match against Sri Lanka, Ahmed was at the crease on 97, when a run-out attempt brought ambiguity in the decision. However, replays declared Salim Malik as dismissed, and Ahmad was called back to the crease. This was the first time for a batsman to return from the pavilion to the crease since 1987.

Coaching career

Ahmed was appointed as the coach of Pakistan's Under-19 cricket team on 20 October 2019. He is also currently appointed as the batting coach and consultant for Lahore Qalandars in the Pakistan Super League.

International centuries
Ijaz Ahmed, a right-handed batsman, has made 22 centuries in international cricket – 12 in Test cricket and 10 in One Day Internationals (ODIs) – and  currently sits joint sixty-fourth in the list of century-makers in international cricket.

Ahmed made his Test debut against India at the Chepauk Stadium, Madras (now Chennai) on 3 February 1987. He scored his first Test century against Australia at the Iqbal Stadium, Faisalabad on 23 September 1988, scoring 122. He scored his final Test century, also against Australia at the WACA Ground, Perth on 26 November 1999, scoring 115. He played his final Test match against New Zealand at Seddon Park, Hamilton on 27 March 2001, having played 60 matches. His highest score in Tests is 211, scored against Sri Lanka at the Bangabandhu National Stadium, Dhaka on 12 March 1999.

Ahmed made his One Day International (ODI) debut against the West Indies at the Jinnah Stadium, Sialkot on 14 November 1986. He scored his first ODI century against Bangladesh at the M. A. Aziz Stadium, Chittagong, scoring 124 not out. He scored his final ODI century against England at the Sharjah Cricket Stadium, Sharjah on 7 April 1999, scoring 137. He played his final ODI in the semi-finals of the 2000 ICC KnockOut Trophy against New Zealand at the Gymkhana Club Ground, Nairobi on 11 October 2000, having played 250 matches. His highest score of 139 not out in ODIs came against India on 2 October 1997 at the Gaddafi Stadium, Lahore.

Key

Test centuries

One Day International centuries

Notes

References

External links 

 

1968 births
Living people
Punjabi people
Pakistan One Day International cricketers
Pakistan Test cricketers
Durham cricketers
Gujranwala cricketers
Habib Bank Limited cricketers
Islamabad cricketers
Lahore City cricketers
Pakistan Automobiles Corporation cricketers
Rawalpindi cricketers
Cricketers at the 1987 Cricket World Cup
Cricketers at the 1992 Cricket World Cup
Cricketers at the 1996 Cricket World Cup
Cricketers at the 1999 Cricket World Cup
Cricketers from Sialkot
Pakistani cricketers
Sialkot cricketers
Pakistan Starlets cricketers
Pakistan Super League coaches
Pakistani cricket coaches
People from Lahore